Hermann Allmers (11 February 1821, Rechtenfleth – 9 March 1902) was a German poet.

He was an only child, and was privately tutored. He began his career in public education, but took over the family farm after the death of his father in 1849.

Through travel, he met a number of influential people who inspired him to take writing seriously, leading to his publication of his Marschenbuch in 1858.

He wrote the poem Feldeinsamkeit which was then made into a song by Johannes Brahms.

External links

 in The New International Encyclopedia, 1906

1821 births
1902 deaths
People from Cuxhaven (district)
People from the Kingdom of Hanover
German poets
German male poets
German-language poets
Writers from Lower Saxony
19th-century poets
19th-century German writers
19th-century German male writers